The Northern Senior A Hockey League was an Ontario Hockey Association-sanctioned senior loop in Southwestern Ontario.  Its champions could compete for the Hardy Cup in the 1980s and briefly for the Allan Cup in the 1990s.

History
The league originated as the OHA Intermediate C Hockey League in the 1970s, became the Northern Intermediate B Hockey League in the 1980s and merged with the Central Senior B Hockey League in the late 1980s, before folding due to lack of interest in 1993.  In 1986-87, the league, with a few other local teams turned into the Georgian Bay Senior A and Georgian Bay Senior B Leagues - this lasted for one season.  Two teams from this league, the Elora Rocks and Shelburne Muskies, still actively exist in the WOAA Senior AA Hockey League.

Teams
Camp Borden
Creemore Chiefs (-1993)
Dundalk Flyers (Sr. B 1986-1987)
Durham Huskies (1983-1987, 1988-1992)
Elora Rocks (-1993)
Grand Valley Tornados
Honeywood Cougars
Kincardine Texacos
Lakeshore Winterhawks (1989-1993)
Markdale Majors (Sr. B 1986-1987)
Owen Sound Canadians/Woodford Royals (1986-1990)
Port Elgin Sunocos
Shelburne Muskies (-1993)
Thornbury (Sr. B 1986-1987)

Champions
1984 Durham Huskies
1985 Durham Huskies
1986 Durham Huskies
1987 Collingwood Shipbuilders (Georgian Sr. A)
??? (Georgian Sr. B)
1988
1989 Creemore Chiefs
1990 Creemore Chiefs
1991 Creemore Chiefs
1992 Elora Rocks
1993 Elora Rocks

Additional Championships
1985 Durham Huskies (OHA Intermediate B J.F. Paxton Cup Champions)
1987 Durham Huskies (Ontario Senior AA J. Ross Robertson Cup Champions)
1987 Collingwood Shipbuilders (OHA Senior A J.F. Paxton Cup Champions)
1989 Durham Huskies (OHA Senior AA  J. Ross Robertson Cup Champions)
1989 Durham Huskies (Ontario/Quebec Senior AA Champions)
1992 Creemore Chiefs (OHA Senior B Ken MacMillan Cup Champions)

Central Sr. B Teams
Durham Huskies
Elora Rocks
Exeter Mohawks
Harriston Blues
Hillsburgh Royals
New Hamburg Panthers
Palmerston 81's
Tavistock Royals

Champions
1986
1987
1988 Exeter Mohawks
1989 Exeter Mohawks

Additional Championships
1988 Exeter Mohawks (OHA Senior AA J. Ross Robertson Cup Champions)
1989 Exeter Mohawks (OHA Senior B Ken MacMillan Cup Champions)

External links
OHA Website

Defunct ice hockey leagues in Ontario